The Beaver Lake is an artificial basin fitted in 1938 on a former swamp located on the Mount Royal, in Montreal, Quebec, Canada. It was designed by architect Frederick Todd.

It takes its name from an old beaver dam discovered during the work.

Description 

It was traditionally used an outdoor rink in winter, but this practice was ended in 2017 and skating now takes place on an artificial rink nearby.

The surroundings of the lake are equipped for various recreational activities: skating and sliding in the winter, vast lawns in summer.

History

The Beaver Lake pavilion

Built between 1956 and 1958, inaugurated in 1961, the pavilion is located west of the lake. Designed by architects Hazen Sise and Guy Desbarats of montreal-based architectural firm Arcop, it was considered one of the most innovative buildings in Montreal, with a corrugated roof and large windows. It was renovated in 2005-2007.

The pavilion houses a restaurant named The Pavilion.

In 2007, the Ordre des architectes du Québec (Order of Architects of Quebec) awarded the Excellence Award in architecture to architects Pierina Saia and Réal Paul and to the City of Montreal for the conservation and heritage restoration of the Beaver Lake pavilion.

See also

 List of rivers and water bodies of Montreal Island

External links

 Official site of Mount Royal Park
 Calypso: equipment image collection from the University of Montreal 
Mount Royal Pavilion web site

Beavers
Beavers
Landforms of Montreal